The Renault Midlum is a range of trucks with a weight between 7.5 and 19 tonnes made by Renault Trucks for urban distribution and local services.

The model was launched in 2000, and the range was revised in 2006 with new 5- and 7-litre engines. The 100,000th unit was manufactured by 2010.

In South America, the Midlum 300 DXI for Argentina, Chile and Uruguay is manufactured by the Uruguayan car and motor vehicle manufacturer Nordex S.A.

The Midlum was replaced by the Renault Trucks D in 2013.

References

External links

Midlum
Cab over vehicles
Vehicles introduced in 2000